Axel Theophilus Helsted (11 April 1847 - 17 February 1907) was a Danish painter.

Biography
Helsted was born in Copenhagen, Denmark. He was the son of the painter Frederik Ferdinand Helsted. He studied at the Royal Danish Academy of Fine Arts, completing his course of study in 1866.
In 1869, he traveled to Paris.  From 1874, he and his wife stayed in Italy. Helsted made a journey to the Netherlands and Belgium in 1890.  In 1887 he became a member of the Royal Academy, in 1892 he received the title of professor.

He exhibited at the Charlottenborg Spring Exhibition between 1865 and 1907 together with various exhibitions at  Paris, Vienna and Munich. He painted the altarpiece of the Church of Christ in Copenhagen.

References

Other sources
Biography at the Dansk biografisk Lexikon (in Danish)

Royal Danish Academy of Fine Arts alumni
19th-century Danish painters
Danish male painters
20th-century Danish painters
Artists from Copenhagen
1847 births
1907 deaths
19th-century Danish male artists
20th-century Danish male artists